Diethylaminosulfur trifluoride (DAST) is the organosulfur compound with the formula Et2NSF3.  This liquid is a fluorinating reagent used for the synthesis of organofluorine compounds.  The compound is colourless; older samples assume an orange colour.

Use in organic synthesis
DAST converts alcohols to the corresponding alkyl fluorides as well as aldehydes and unhindered ketones to geminal difluorides. Carboxylic acids react no further than the acyl fluoride (sulfur tetrafluoride effects the transformation —CO2H → —CF3).  DAST is used in preference to the more classical gaseous SF4, since as a liquid it is more easily handled.  A slightly thermally more stable compound is morpho-DAST. Acid-labile substrates are less likely to undergo rearrangement and elimination since DAST is less prone to contamination with acids. Reaction temperatures are milder as well – alcohols typically react at −78 °C and ketones around 0 °C.

Synthesis
DAST is prepared by the reaction of diethylaminotrimethylsilane and sulfur tetrafluoride:
Et2NSiMe3 + SF4 → Et2NSF3  +  Me3SiF
The original paper calls for trichlorofluoromethane (Freon-11) as a solvent, a compound that has been banned under the Montreal Protocol and is no longer available as a commodity chemical. Diethyl ether is a green alternative that can be used with no decrease in yield.  Because of the dangers involved in the preparation of DAST (glass etching, possibility of exothermic events), it is often purchased from a commercial source.  At one time Carbolabs was one of the few suppliers of the chemical but a number of companies now sell DAST. Carbolabs was acquired by Sigma-Aldrich in 1998.

Safety and alternative reagents
Upon heating, DAST converts to the highly explosive (NEt2)2SF2 with expulsion of sulfur tetrafluoride. To minimize accidents, samples are maintained below 50 °C. Bis-(2-methoxyethyl)aminosulfur trifluoride (trade name: Deoxo-Fluor) and  difluoro(morpholino)sulfonium tetrafluoroborate (trade name: XtalFluor-M) are reagents derived from DAST with less explosive potential
XtalFluor-E has been jointly developed by OmegaChem Inc. and Manchester Organics Ltd. in 2009–2010.

See also

Ishikawa reagent
Fluorination with aminosulfuranes

References

Organofluorides
Reagents for organic chemistry
Fluorinating agents
Diethylamino compounds
Organosulfur compounds